Mark-Alexander Uth (born 24 August 1991) is a German professional footballer who plays as a striker for Bundesliga club 1. FC Köln. At the international level, he played for the Germany national team. Once-capped by Germany U20 in 2010, Uth was called up to the senior team in 2018, making one appearance as well.

Club career

Youth
Uth started playing football at TuS Langel, a small club based in the south of Cologne. Having joined 1. FC Köln in 2004, he left in 2007 for Viktoria Köln.

1. FC Köln II
In 2009, he returned to 1. FC Köln and was promoted to the second team playing in the fourth-tier Regionalliga West in 2010. After good performances there, he became a member of the first team's squad for the 2011–12 Bundesliga season, but did not make an appearance. Because the club had several further young strikers, it was decided that Uth could leave the club.

SC Heerenveen
In May 2012, it was announced that Uth had signed for SC Heerenveen on a three-year contract.

He scored a hat-trick while playing on loan for Heracles Almelo in their match against RKC Waalwijk on 28 September 2013.

1899 Hoffenheim
He signed for Bundesliga side 1899 Hoffenheim in July 2015. Depending on the source, the transfer fee paid to Heerenveen was reported as €2 to 3 million.

Schalke 04
In January 2018, it was announced that Uth would move to Schalke 04 on a free transfer in summer. He signed a contract until 2022.

Loan to 1. FC Köln
In January 2020, it was announced that Köln had signed Uth from Schalke 04 on loan for the rest of the 2019–20 season.

International career
Uth has earned one cap for the Germany U20 team. In a 3–2 victory versus Switzerland on 6 September 2010 he was put in for Cenk Tosun in the 65th minute.

On 5 October 2018, Uth was called up to the Germany national football team for the first time, featuring in the squad for the UEFA Nations League matches against the Netherlands and France.

Career statistics

Club

International

References

External links
Mark Uth at Voetbal International 

1991 births
Living people
Footballers from Cologne
German footballers
Association football forwards
Germany youth international footballers
Germany international footballers
Bundesliga players
Regionalliga players
Eredivisie players
1. FC Köln players
1. FC Köln II players
FC Viktoria Köln players
SC Heerenveen players
Heracles Almelo players
TSG 1899 Hoffenheim players
FC Schalke 04 players
German expatriate footballers
German expatriate sportspeople in the Netherlands
Expatriate footballers in the Netherlands